The following is an overview of public housing estates in Quarry Hill and No. 12 Hill, Kowloon, Hong Kong, including Home Ownership Scheme (HOS), Private Sector Participation Scheme (PSPS), Sandwich Class Housing Scheme (SCHS), Flat-for-Sale Scheme (FFSS), and Tenants Purchase Scheme (TPS) estates.

History

Overview

Cascades

Cascades is a Sandwich Class Housing Scheme estate developed by the Hong Kong Housing Society in Chung Hau Street, No. 12 Hill, Kowloon, Hong Kong. It is located near Chun Man Court, Ho Man Tin Estate, Ho Man Tin Government Offices, Hong Kong Metropolitan University and the Hong Kong Housing Authority Headquarters. It consists of four residential blocks completed in 1999 and offering 712 units. Cascades is located in Oi Man constituency of the Kowloon City District Council. It was formerly represented by Mak Sui-ki, who was elected in the 2019 elections until July 2021.

Houses

Cascades is in Primary One Admission (POA) School Net 34. Within the school net are multiple aided schools (operated independently but funded with government money) and two government schools: Farm Road Government Primary School and Ma Tau Chung Government Primary School.

Chun Man Court

Chun Man Court is a Home Ownership Scheme court on No. 12 Hill, near Oi Man Estate. It consists of 12 blocks built in 1981.

Houses

Ho Man Tin Estate / Kwun Fai Court / Kwun Hei Court

Ho Man Tin Estate consists of 9 residential blocks and a shopping arcade, including 8 blocks and the shopping arcade of Ho Man Tin (South) Estate on Quarry Hill.

Oi Man Estate

Oi Man Estate is a public housing estate on No. 12 Hill, Kowloon City District, Kowloon, Hong Kong. It is the largest public housing estate in Kowloon City District. It has a total of 12 residential blocks which were completed between 1974 and 1975. It was officially opened by the Acting Governor Sir Denys Roberts on 20 November 1975.

The estate was built at a cost of $186 million and comprises 6,200 flats designed to house some 46,000 residents based on the Housing Authority's former space allocation standards of 35 square feet per person. The "authorised population" of Oi Man Estate has since been revised to 18,900 residents. It was designed by Housing Department architects, and followed the 1970s estate design innovation of being planned as to "provide every convenience for its residents from banks, markets to barbershops." To this end the estate opened with a three-storey air-conditioned commercial complex, a market, and cooked food stalls.

The British Hong Kong Government admired the construction of the estate because its construction showed improvements in public housing standards in Hong Kong. Oi Man Estate was on the itinerary of Queen Elizabeth II when she visited Hong Kong in 1975. Leader of the British Conservative Party Margaret Thatcher also visited in 1977 and toured Tak Man House, commenting on the modern living conditions, cleanliness of the block, and the cool air circulating within the Twin Tower block's atrium.

Houses

Sheung Lok Estate

Sheung Lok Estate was built on the former site of Sheung Shing Street Temporary Housing Area, the estate has only one residential building built in 1998 on Quarry Hill.

House

References

Ho Man Tin